Marimuthu Palaniswami from The University of Melbourne, Parkville, Victoria, Australia was named Fellow of the Institute of Electrical and Electronics Engineers (IEEE) in 2012 for contributions to computational intelligence, learning systems, and nonlinear modelling.

Palaniswami received his Ph.D. from the University of Newcastle, Australia.

References

External links

Fellow Members of the IEEE
Living people
Australian computer scientists
University of Newcastle (Australia) alumni
Year of birth missing (living people)
Place of birth missing (living people)